The 1963 Vanderbilt Commodores football team represented Vanderbilt University in the 1963 NCAA University Division football season. The Commodores were led by head coach John Green in his first season and finished the season with a record of one win, seven losses and two ties (1–7–2 overall, 0–5–2 in the SEC).

Schedule

Source: 1963 Vanderbilt football schedule

References

Vanderbilt
Vanderbilt Commodores football seasons
Vanderbilt Commodores football